The Peru-Bolivian Confederation was divided into 3 states; North Peru, South Peru and the Bolivian Republic.

These states were subdivided into departments; 17 total, 5 for North Peru, 5 for South Peru and 7 for Bolivia. Each department was then further subdivided into provinces.

References

Peru-Bolivian Confederation
Peru–Bolivian Confederation